Simon Douglas Mantell (born 24 April 1984) is an English field hockey forward. He is the younger brother of Richard Mantell.

Mantell currently plays for Exeter University Hockey Club.
 
Mantell made his international senior debut for the national squad on 9 November 2005 versus Ireland at Beeston. He was a member of the England squad that finished fifth at the 2006 Men's Hockey World Cup. He competed at the 2010 and 2011 Champions Trophy, and was also part of the winning squad at the 2009 EuroHockey Championship.
Mantell has also represented Great Britain and was part of the side that returned victorious from the Olympic qualifying event in Chile, as well as competing at the 2008 Summer Olympics. He also competed at the 2006, 2010 and 2014 Commonwealth Games.

Mantell was born in Bridgwater, Somerset. He was educated at Millfield School in Street, followed by the University of Birmingham. Mantell has played club hockey for Wimbledon, Reading and Bristol Firebrands, as well as for HGC in the Netherlands and Mumbai Magicians in the Hockey India League.

References

External links
 
 
 
 

1984 births
Living people
People educated at Millfield
English male field hockey players
Male field hockey forwards
Field hockey players at the 2006 Commonwealth Games
2006 Men's Hockey World Cup players
Field hockey players at the 2008 Summer Olympics
Field hockey players at the 2010 Commonwealth Games
Field hockey players at the 2014 Commonwealth Games
2014 Men's Hockey World Cup players
Field hockey players at the 2016 Summer Olympics
Olympic field hockey players of Great Britain
British male field hockey players
People from Bridgwater
Alumni of the University of Birmingham
Commonwealth Games bronze medallists for England
Commonwealth Games medallists in field hockey
Reading Hockey Club players
HGC players
Wimbledon Hockey Club players
Expatriate field hockey players
Hockey India League players
University of Birmingham Hockey Club players
Medallists at the 2014 Commonwealth Games